Zoltar may refer to

 Zoltar (fortune telling robot), a robotic character in the  1988 film Big
 Zoltar (Battle of the Planets), a character from the anime series Battle of the Planets